The Roaring Lion is a black and white photographic portrait of a 67-year-old Winston Churchill as Prime Minister of the United Kingdom. The portrait was taken in 1941 by Armenian-Canadian photographer Yousuf Karsh in the Centre Block on Parliament Hill in Ottawa, Ontario, Canada.

Date and location of photography
The photograph was shot on December 30, 1941, in the Speaker's Chamber of the Canadian Speaker of the House of Commons at Parliament in Ottawa after Churchill delivered his "Some chicken, some neck" speech on World War II to Canadian members of parliament. The brief photo session was arranged by the Canadian prime minister, William Lyon Mackenzie King.

Description
Churchill is particularly noted for his posture and facial expression, likened to the wartime feelings that prevailed in the UKpersistence in the face of an all-conquering enemy. The photo session was only to last two minutes. Karsh asked the prime minister to put down his cigar, as the smoke would interfere with the image. Churchill refused, so just before taking the photograph, Karsh quickly moved toward the prime minister and said, "Forgive me, sir," while snatching the cigar from his subject's mouth. Karsh said, "By the time I got back to the camera, he looked so belligerent, he could have devoured me". His scowl has been compared to "a fierce glare as if confronting the enemy". Following the taking of the photo, Churchill stated, "You can even make a roaring lion stand still to be photographed," thus giving the picture its notable name.

USC Fisher Museum of Art described it as a "defiant and scowling portrait [which] became an instant icon of Britain's stand against fascism."

Impact on Karsh's career
The resulting image—one of the 20th century's most iconic portraits—effectively launched Karsh's international career.

Signed prints of this portrait from Karsh's studio were produced using gelatin silver on paper. They were signed as "© Y Karsh Ottawa" in white marker in the lower left or lower right corner. This later changed to Karsh signing in ink on one of the lower corners of the white border surrounding the photograph.

The original negative and the vast collection of Karsh's images were donated by his estate to the Library and Archives Canada in 1992. Since then, copies taken from the original negative have not been allowed. 
In 1998, an original signed print of the image was installed in the reading room of the Fairmont Château Laurier hotel in Ottawa, where Karsh had operated his studio from 1972 until 1992. Karsh, with his wife Estrellita, lived in the hotel for nearly two decades. On August 19, 2022, it was discovered that this print had been stolen and replaced with a fake. A staff member noticed that the frame on the picture did not match the other five portraits in the lounge, which Karsh also donated. Jerry Fielder, the director of Karsh's estate, immediately recognized that the Karsh signature on the print was a forgery and said that the stolen print was made from the original negative by Karsh in his Château Laurier studio.

Uses
The photograph appeared on the cover of the May 21, 1945, issue of Life, which bought its one-time use for $100. One of the first prints of the original negative hangs on the wall in the Speaker's Chamber of the Speaker of the House of Commons of Canada, where the image was photographed. In 2008, Canada Post released a $1.60CDN commemorative stamp of the image; 325,000 copies were printed. Since 2013, it has appeared on the £5 note issued by the Bank of England. In 2019, the Royal Canadian Mint, with permission from the Karsh estate, released a  pure silver $100CDN face value coin. Only 700 examples were minted.

See also
 List of photographs considered the most important

References

External links 

 'Some chicken; some neck' speech transcript (those words appear at the end of the 12th paragraph)
 Winston Churchill – Yousuf Karsh (includes a second photo of Churchill from that session)
 Yousuf Karsh fonds (R613) at Library and Archives Canada
 Karsh masterworks – a tribute – Library and Archives Canada
 Stamp: Yousuf Karsh – Sir Winston Churchill

1941 in art
1940s photographs
Black-and-white photographs
Stolen works of art
Winston Churchill